Thomas Hill (October 16, 1846 - ) was an American farmer and livestock dealer from Spring Green who served a single two-year term as a Republican member of the Wisconsin State Assembly from Sauk County.

Hill was born in Lancashire, England, on October 16, 1846. He was elected to the assembly in 1888, with 1,925 votes against 1,266 votes for Democrat Lawrence Watson, and 312
votes for E. 0. Stone, Prohibition Party candidate.

References 

1846 births
19th-century American politicians
Republican Party members of the Wisconsin State Assembly
Politicians from Lancashire
Year of death unknown
Farmers from Wisconsin
English emigrants to the United States